Friar Julian was one of a group of Hungarian Dominican friars who, in 1235, left Hungary in order to find those Magyars who — according to the chronicles — remained in the eastern homeland. After travelling a great distance, Friar Julian reached the capital of Volga Bulgaria, where he was told that the Magyars lived only two days' travel away. Julian found them, and despite the gap of at least 300–400 years since the split between the Magyars that invaded and settled in Pannonia and those that were found in Bashkiria, their language remained mutually intelligible, and they were able to communicate.

Julian named the old country Magna Hungaria or Great Hungary. He became aware of stories about the Tatars, who were the enemies of the eastern Magyars and Bulgars. Two years after the original journey, Julian returned to Magna Hungaria, only to find it had been devastated by the Mongol Tatars. He returned to his kingdom with news of mortal danger and a Mongol ultimatum to Hungary.

The Dominican order was established in Hungary in 1221 with the aim of evangelizing the East, which simultaneously raised the issue of discovering the Hungarians who had remained on the native soil. The significance of Julian’s travels: he was the first one to bring valid information about Hungarians living in Magna Hungaria, which contributes a lot to research on Hungarian  history, he was the first one to bring news on the upcoming Mongol invasion of Europe, he was the first European traveler who gathered valid information on Asia, and his descriptions are of great importance from the geographical aspect, which gave essential motivation to future European explorers and researchers.

See also
Mongol invasion of Volga Bulgaria
Battle of Mohi
Eastern Magyars

References

External links
 De facto Ungariae Magnae

Hungarian Dominicans
Volga Bulgaria
Hungarian explorers
13th-century Hungarian people
13th-century explorers
History of Ural